Shidrovo is a rural locality (a village) in Shidrovskoye Rural Settlement of Vinogradovsky District, Arkhangelsk Oblast, Russia. The population was 63 as of 2010.

Geography 
Shidrovo is located on the Vaga River, 50 km southeast of Bereznik (the district's administrative centre) by road. Shidrovo (settlement) is the nearest rural locality.

References

Rural localities in Vinogradovsky District